Polytechnic University of the Philippines, Sablayan Campus or PUP Sablayan is the 21st PUP campus located in Sitio Macambang, Brgy. Buenavista, municipality of Sablayan, Occidental Mindoro, Philippines. Tt is an LGU-funded campus.

The campus was created through a Memorandum of Agreement (MOA) between the university and the Municipal Government of Sablayan on October 6, 2010.

Academics

College of Cooperatives (CC)
 Bachelor in Cooperative

College of Tourism, Hospitality and Transportation Management (CTHTM)
 Associate in Tourism Management

Open University
 Master in Public Administration
 Master in Educational Management

References

External links
 Polytechnic University of the Philippines Official Website

Universities and colleges in Occidental Mindoro
Polytechnic University of the Philippines
2010 establishments in the Philippines
Educational institutions established in 2010